Jim Turner may refer to:

Sports
 Jim Turner (baseball) (1903–1998), Major League Baseball pitcher
 Jim Turner (center) (1912–1995), American football player
 Jim Turner (placekicker) (born 1941), American football player
 Jim Turner (wide receiver) (born 1975), signed by Carolina Panthers in 1998 NFL Draft
 Jim Turner (sailor) (born 1975), New Zealand Olympic sailor

Entertainment
 Jim Turner (editor) (1945–1999), editor at Arkham House
 Jim Turner (comedian) (born 1952), American comedian and actor
 Jim Turner (singer) (born 1946), American country singer and songwriter on The Lawrence Welk Show

Other
 Jim Turner (criminal) (fl. 1854–1866), American criminal figure, pugilist, and enforcer for Tammany Hall
 Jim Turner (politician) (born 1946), U.S. Congressman from Texas

See also
 Jimmy Turner (disambiguation)
 Jimmie Turner (born 1962), American football player
 James Turner (disambiguation)
 Turner (surname)